Inter*Face is the eighteenth album by Klaus Schulze. It was originally released in 1985, and in 2006 was the twentieth Schulze album reissued by Revisited Records. The two bonus tracks on the reissue were both previously released on Schulze's 25-disc CD box set Jubilee Edition (1997), which was later included on the 50-disc CD box set The Ultimate Edition (2000). However, a shorter version of "Nichtarische Arie" was included (as "Maxxi", 7:43).

Track listing
All tracks composed by Klaus Schulze.

External links
 Inter*Face at the official site of Klaus Schulze
 

Klaus Schulze albums
1985 albums